

Historical and architectural interest bridges

Major road and railway bridges 
This table presents the structures with spans greater than 100 meters (non-exhaustive list).

Notes and References 
 

 Others references

See also 

 Transport in Indonesia
 Rail transport in Indonesia
 Geography of Indonesia
 List of islands of Indonesia
 List of toll roads in Indonesia
 List of roads and highways of Java

External links

Further reading 
 

Indonesia
 
Bridges
Bridges